Sir Francis Leigh (ca. 1651 – 17 November 1711), of Hawley, Sutton-at-Hone, Kent, was an English Member of Parliament and lawyer.

He was a Member of Parliament (MP) for Kent from 1702 to 1705.

References

1650s births
1711 deaths
English MPs 1702–1705
People from Sutton-at-Hone
Year of birth uncertain